Sokkate of Toungoo governor of Toungoo from 1379/80 to 1383. He came to power by assassinating his brother-in-law Pyanchi II. Sokkate proved to be a tyrant, and lost his standing with Toungoo's overlord Ava. In 1383, he was assassinated by an Ava loyalist Phaungga.

References

Bibliography
 
 

Ava dynasty
1383 deaths